Wecker is a small town in the commune of Biwer, in eastern Luxembourg. It is located on banks of Syr River. , the town had a population of 749. The largest employer is the tool factory Proxxon S.A.

References 

Biwer
Towns in Luxembourg